Lord Beaverbrook High School (LBHS) is a public high school in Calgary, Alberta, Canada operated by the Calgary Board of Education. It was founded in 1967 and the first year of attendance was in 1968. It has approximately 1,100 students and 100 staff members. It is named after Max Aitken, Lord Beaverbrook. The school's mascot is a "Lord"—a black, silver, and white lion wearing a crown.

The school is part of the Action for Bright Children Society.

Notable alumni
Andy Ta, professional League of Legends player.
Don Cairns, former National Hockey League player.
Tommy Campbell, actor, stand-up comedian and comedy writer/director
Owen Hargreaves, former professional footballer for Bayern Munich, Manchester United, and Manchester City F.C.
Tim Hunter, former National Hockey League player
Stu Laird, former Canadian Football League player
Lisa Lobsinger, vocalist for the band Reverie Sound Revue and Broken Social Scene
Jeff Pain, Olympic Silver medallist
Ross Pederson, Canadian Motocross Champion  
Ben Rankel, cartoonist and comic book artist
Patricia Relf, author
Chris Robanske, Olympian (2014, 2018) and former Canadian Snowboard Federation.
Mark Tewksbury, Canadian gold medalist swimmer and actor
Robert Thirsk, CSA astronaut
Kent Warnock, former Canadian Football League player.

References

External links

Lord Beaverbrook High School

High schools in Calgary
Educational institutions established in 1967
1967 establishments in Alberta